The Mixe–Zoque  (also: Mixe–Zoquean, Mije–Soke, Mije–Sokean) languages are a language family whose living members are spoken in and around the Isthmus of Tehuantepec, Mexico. The Mexican government recognizes three distinct Mixe–Zoquean languages as official: Mixe or ayook with 188,000 speakers, Zoque  or o'de püt with 88,000 speakers, and the Popoluca languages of which some are Mixean and some Zoquean with 69,000 speakers. However, the internal diversity in each of these groups is great. Ethnologue counts 17 different languages, and the current classification of Mixe–Zoquean languages by Wichmann (1995) counts 12 languages and 11 dialects. Extinct languages classified as Mixe–Zoquean include Tapachultec, formerly spoken in Tapachula, along the southeast coast of Chiapas.

History
Historically the Mixe–Zoquean family may have been much more widespread, reaching into the Guatemalan Pacific coast (i.e. the Soconusco region). Terrence Kaufman and Lyle Campbell have argued, based on a number of widespread loanwords in other Mesoamerican languages, that it is likely that the Olmec people, generally seen as the earliest dominating culture of Mesoamerica, spoke a Mixe–Zoquean language.  Kaufman and John Justeson also claim to have deciphered a substantial part of the text written in Isthmian script (called also by them and some others 'Epi-Olmec') which appears on La Mojarra Stela 1, based upon their deciphering of the text as representing an archaic Mixe–Zoquean language.

Both of these claims have been criticized: Michael D. Coe and David Stuart argue that the surviving corpus of the few known examples of Isthmian inscriptions is insufficient to securely ground any proposed decipherment. Their attempt to apply Kaufman's and Justeson's decipherments to other extant Isthmian material failed to produce any meaningful results. Wichmann (1995) criticizes certain proposed Mixe–Zoquean loans into other Mesoamerican languages as being only Zoquean, not Mixean, which would put the period of borrowing much later than the Proto-Mixe–Zoquean time-frame in which the Olmec culture was at its height. The date of the Mixe–Zoque split has however since been pushed back, and the argument is therefore much weaker than it once was thought to be.

Later, Kaufman (2001), again on the basis of putative loans from Mixe–Zoque into other Mesoamerican languages, argued a Mixe–Zoquean presence at Teotihuacan, and he ascribed to Mixe–Zoquean an important role in spreading a number of the linguistic features that later became some of the principal commonalities used in defining the Mesoamerican Linguistic Area.

Genetic relations with other families

The Mixe–Zoque languages have been included in several long-range classification proposals, e.g. in Edward Sapir's "Mexican Penutian" branch of his proposed Penutian linguistic superfamily,  or as part of the Macro-Mayan proposal by Norman McQuown with puts together the Mixe–Zoque languages with the Mayan languages and the Totonacan languages. At the end of the last century, Lyle Campbell dismissed most earlier comparisons as methodologically flawed, but considered the Macro-Mayan proposal the most promising, but yet unproven hypothesis. In two more recently published articles, evidence is presented for linking the Mixe–Zoque languages either with the Totonacan languages ("Totozoquean"), or with the Mayan languages.

Classification

Wichmann (1995)
The following internal classification of the Mixe–Zoquean languages is by Søren Wichmann (1995).

Proto-Mixe-Zoquean
Proto-Mixean
Tapachultec
Sayula Popoluca (Sayultec)
Oluta Popoluca (Olutec)
Proto-Oaxaca Mixean
North Highland Mixe
South Highland Mixe
Midland Mixe, Lowland Mixe
Proto-Zoquean
Proto-Gulf Zoquean
Chimalapa Zoque
Chiapas Zoque

Kaufman & Justeson (2000)
The following internal classification of the Mixe–Zoquean languages is by Kaufman & Justeson (2000), cited in Zavala (2000). Individual languages are marked by italics.

Mixe-Zoque
Mixe
Tapachultec
Olutec
Mixe Proper
Sayultec
(branch)
Lowland Mixe
Highland Mixe
Zoque
Gulf Zoquean
Soteapan Zoque (Sierra Popoluca)
(branch)
Texistepec Zoque
Ayapanec Zoque
Zoque
Chiapas Zoque
Oaxaca Zoque

Justeson and Kaufman also classify the language represented in the Epi-Olmec script as an early Zoquean language, although this claim is disputed by Andrew Robinson.

Phonology

The phoneme inventory of Proto-Mixe–Zoquean as reconstructed by Wichmann (1995) can be seen to be relatively simple, but many of the modern languages have been innovative; some have become quite vowel rich, and some also have introduced a fortis–lenis contrast in the stop series. Although the lateral phoneme  is found in a few words in some of the languages, these are probably of onomatopoeic origin.

  has also been reconstructed  .

Syllables
Complex syllable-final consonant clusters are also typical in the daughter languages and can be reconstructed for the proto-language.

Proto-Mixe–Zoquean syllable nuclei could be either:
V – short vowel
V' – short vowel with glottal stop
VV – long vowel
V'V – long vowel with medial glottal stop
VV' – long vowel with final glottal stop
Vh – short vowel with h

Grammatical features

The Mixe–Zoquean languages are head-marking and polysynthetic, with morphologically complex verbs and simple nouns. Grammatical subjects as well as objects are marked in the verb. Ergative alignment is used, as well as direct–inverse systems triggered by animacy and topicality. In Mixe–Zoquean verbs, a morphological distinction is made between two basic clause-types, independent and dependent; verbs take different aspectual and personal affixes, depending on the type of clause in which they appear. There are two different sets of aspect-markers, one used in dependent clauses and another used in independent clauses. Three aspects are distinguished within each clause-type: incompletive, completive, and irrealis.

Ethnologue classification and SIL ISO-codes
Ethnologue still uses the earlier pre-Wichmann classification, based on surveys of mutual intelligibility and comparative work by William Wonderly, as a basis for their work. This classification is not used by historical linguists, and Lyle Campbell's authoritative 1997 presentation uses Wichmann's classification.

Mixe languages — an estimated 90,000 native speakers
Eastern Mixe — An estimated 72,000 native speakers
Dialects: Coatlán (mco), Istmo (mir), Quetzaltepec (pxm), Juquila (mxq), Mazatlán (mzl)
Veracruz Mixe — An estimated 4,000 native speakers
Dialects: Oluta (plo) nearly extinct – only 100 speakers, Sayula (pos)
Western Mixe
An estimated 10,000 native speakers
Dialects: Totontepec (mto), Tlahuitoltepec (mxp)
Zoque languages — an estimated 60,000 native speakers
Chiapas Zoque — An estimated 22,000 native speakers
Dialects: Copainalá (zoc), Rayón (zor), Francisco León (zos)
Oaxaca Zoque – An estimated 4,500 native speakers
Dialect: Chimalapa (zoh)
Veracruz Zoque — An estimated 30,000 native speakers
Dialects: Highland (poi),  Texistepec (poq) nearly extinct – only 450 speakers, Tabasco (zoq) nearly extinct – only 40 speakers

Notes

References

 
 
 Campbell, L., and T. Kaufman (1976), "A Linguistic Look at the Olmecs", American Antiquity, 41 pp. 80–89.
 Justeson, John S., and Kaufman, Terrence, (1997),"A Newly Discovered Column in the Hieroglyphic Text on La Mojarra Stela 1: a Test of the Epi-Olmec Decipherment", Science, 07/11/97, Vol. 277 Issue 5323, p. 207.
 Justeson, John S., and Kaufman, Terrence (2001) Epi-Olmec Hieroglyphic Writing and Texts.
 Kaufman, Terrence, (2001) Nawa linguistic prehistory, published at website of the Mesoamerican Language Documentation Project 
 
 
 
 
 
 Brigham Young University press release  on behalf of Brigham Young University archaeologist Stephen Houston and Yale University professor emeritus Michael Coe disputing Justeson/Kaufman findings.

External links

Mixe–Zoque language family

 
Language families
Mesoamerican languages
Indigenous languages of Mexico